Samuel Harper Hogin (March 6, 1950 – August 9, 2004) was a country music songwriter. Hogin was nominated for the Country Music Association's Song of the Year award in 1981 for "I Believe in You" (co-written with Roger Cook) and in 1998 for "A Broken Wing" (co-written with Cook, James House, and Phil Barnhart).

Songs (written or cowritten)

 "Anything for Love" (performed by James House)
 "A Broken Wing" (performed by Martina McBride)
 "Crazy from the Heat" (performed by Lorrie Morgan)
 "Dance with the One That Brought You" (performed by Shania Twain)
 "Don't Get Me Started" (performed by Rhett Akins)
 "Gettin' Even" (performed by John Schneider)
 "I Believe in You" (performed by Don Williams)
 "I Don't Know How Not to Love You" (performed by Nikki Nelson)
 "I Want to Be Loved Like That" (performed by Shenandoah)
 "If You Don't Love Me by Now" (performed by Eloise Laws)
 "Livin' in These Troubled Times" (performed by Crystal Gayle)
 "No News" (performed by Lonestar) 
 "Rough and Tumble Heart" (performed by Highway 101 and Pam Tillis)
 "Runnin' Away with My Heart" (performed by Lonestar)
 "Sawmill Road" (performed by Diamond Rio)
 "Thanks to You" (performed by John Denver)
 "Too Many Lovers" (performed by Crystal Gayle)
 "Walking to Jerusalem" (performed by Mark D. Sanders)
 "What I Meant to Say" (performed by Wade Hayes)

References

American male songwriters
1950 births
2004 deaths
20th-century American musicians
People from Carroll County, Tennessee
20th-century American male musicians